Mella Pesungal is a 1983 Indian Tamil-language film, directed by the duo Bharathi–Vasu. It stars Bhanupriya and Vasanth. The film marked the debut of Bhanupriya in the film industry. It was released on 24 June 1983.

Plot 

Prabhu, a young man, falls in love with Uma, a school teacher. Their love life runs into trouble due to an unpleasant incident happened in Prabhu's house.

Cast 

Bhanupriya as Uma
Vasanth
Y. G. Mahendra
Vinu Chakravarthy
Anuradha

Soundtrack 
The soundtrack was composed by Ilaiyaraaja.

References

External links 
 

1983 films
Films scored by Ilaiyaraaja
Films directed by P. Vasu
1980s Tamil-language films
Films directed by Santhana Bharathi